Johann Christian Gottlieb Ackermann (17 February 1756 – 9 March 1801) was a German doctor.

Biography
He was born at Zeulenroda, in Upper Saxony, on 17 February 1756. His parents were the physician Johann Samuel Ackermann (1705-1762) and the Eva Rosine Oberreuther (1722-1776), the daughter of the tanning master Paul Steinmüller.

Attending the University of Jena at only fifteen years old, Johann found a teacher in Ernst Gottfried Baldinger. The two relocated to Göttingen where he studied, apart from medicine, the classical sciences, as a student of Christian Gottlob Heyne. Ackermann was promoted in 1775 to private lecturer at the medical faculty of Halle, where he lived for two years. Afterwards, he returned to Zeulenroda to practice medicine and physics. In 1786, he followed a call to Altdorf, where he was appointed professor of chemistry. In 1794 he accepted a position as chair of applied medicine and - at the same time - a position as the head of the local hospital for the poor. He died at the age of 45 from tuberculosis.

The main focus of Ackermann's scientific works lies in his historical studies of the medical sciences during the Middle Ages. He collected several rare medical writings and translated foreign publications into German.
He wrote Institutiones Historiae Medicinae (Nuremberg, 1792) and Institutiones Therapiae Generalis (Nuremberg and Altdorf, 1784-1795).

Publications

 Regimen sanitatis Salerni, Stendal, 1790
 Institutiones historicae medicinae, Nuremberg, 1792
 Bemerkungen über die Kenntnis und Kur einiger Krankheiten, 7 booklets in old German language, 1794-1800

Sources

 Allgemeine Deutsche Biographie - online version

References

1756 births
1801 deaths
People from Zeulenroda-Triebes
People from Reuss
18th-century German physicians
University of Jena alumni
University of Göttingen alumni
Academic staff of the Martin Luther University of Halle-Wittenberg
Academic staff of the University of Altdorf
19th-century deaths from tuberculosis
Tuberculosis deaths in Germany